System D is a manner of responding to challenges that require one to have the ability to think quickly, to adapt, and to improvise when getting a job done. The term gained wider popularity in the United States after appearing in the 2006 publication of Anthony Bourdain's The Nasty Bits.  Bourdain references finding the term in Nicolas Freeling's memoir, The Kitchen, about Freeling's years as a Grand Hotel cook in France.

The term is a direct translation of French . The verbs  and  mean to make do, to manage, especially in an adverse situation. Basically, it refers to one's ability and need to be resourceful.

In Down and Out in Paris and London, George Orwell described the term  as something the lowest-level kitchen workers, the s, wanted to be called, indicating that they were people who would get the job done, no matter what.

In recent literature on the informal economy, System D is the growing share of the world's economy which makes up the underground economy, which  has a projected GDP of $10 trillion. The informal economy is usually considered as one part of a dual economy. The concept of dual economy is where the economy is divided into two parts – the formal and the informal. The formal economy consists of all economic activities that operate within the official legal framework and are regulated by the government. In common parlance, it is understood as enterprises and citizens who pay taxes on all generated incomes. The reason Neuwirth describes this kind of an economy as a DIY economy or system D is because of the self-reliance of the members within this sector. Due to lack of documentation, such as proof of citizenship, tax ID number, proof of identity or proof of address, people working in this sector are usually left with no way to seek support from their governments. This means that they are unable to access formal institutions which require documentation, and forces them to be self-reliant.

This is not to be confused with autarky or self-reliant economies. Economists define self-sufficiency or self-reliance as the state of not requiring any aid, support, interaction, or trade with the outside world. It is generally believed that a fully self-dependent economy or autarky is not possible in today's world.

The term in different languages
There are a range of terms in other languages describing similar circumstances.

See also
Agorism
Bricolage
WIEGO
systemd, a suite of system components for Linux, whose name is inspired by System D.

References 

French slang
Informal economy